Smiley is a surname which may refer to:

People
Brett Smiley (1955–2016), American singer
Brett Smiley (politician), American politician
Charles Hugh Smiley (1903–1977), American astronomer
Colonel David Smiley (1916–2009), British special forces and intelligence officer
Forbes Smiley, (born 1956), American map thief
Gordon Smiley (1946–1982), American race car driver
Jane Smiley (born 1949), American author
Janelle Smiley (born 1981), American ski mountaineer
John Smiley (baseball) (born 1965), American baseball left-handed pitcher 1980s and '90s
Joseph W. Smiley (1870–1945), American silent actor
Justin Smiley (born 1981), American National Football League guard
Mert Smiley (born 1951), Louisiana politician
Michael Smiley (born 1963), Northern Irish actor and comedian
Norman Smiley professional wrestler for World Championship Wrestling (1998–2001)
Red Smiley (1925–1972), American singer in Reno and Smiley
Rickey Smiley, comedian/actor
Tavis Smiley (born 1964), American journalist
Tava Smiley (born 1971), American actress and television host.
Thomas Smiley ( – 1689), Williamite defender at the Siege of Derry

Fictional characters
George Smiley, spy in John le Carré novels
Guy Smiley, on Sesame Street
Jim Smiley, gambler in the Mark Twain story "The Celebrated Jumping Frog of Calaveras County"